Ruan Venter (born 29 November 2002) is a South African rugby union player for the  in the Currie Cup. His regular position is flank.

Venter was named in the  side for the 2022 Currie Cup Premier Division.

References

South African rugby union players
Living people
Rugby union locks
Golden Lions players
2002 births
Rugby union players from the Western Cape
Lions (United Rugby Championship) players